HMS Princess Margaret was a minelayer operated by the British Royal Navy during and after the First World War.

The outbreak of war caused her to be taken over by the Royal Navy and to be converted to a minelayer, carrying as many as 500 mines. She was widely used for minelaying in the North Sea and English Channel during the war, which she survived, having laid the most mines of any Royal Navy ship during the war. She remained in Royal Navy service following the end of the war, taking part in the British intervention in the Russian Civil War. She was sold for scrap in 1929.

Construction and design
In 1914, two fast passenger ships,  and Princess Margaret, were being built by the Scottish shipbuilder William Denny for the Princess fleet of the Canadian Pacific Railway Coast Service to use in its service between Vancouver and Seattle. Princess Margaret was launched at Denny's Dunbarton shipyard on 24 June 1914.

Princesses Irene and Margaret were requisitioned and made into minelayers in order to increase the Royal Navy's capacity for minelaying. The ships had a gross register tonnage of 5934 t. They had a crew of 225.

Armament consisted of two 4.7 in (120 mm) guns, two 12-pounder (76 mm) guns, two 6-pounder (57 mm) anti-aircraft guns and one 2-pounder pom-pom anti-aircraft autocannon. They could carry up to 500 mines.

Service

World War I

Princess Margaret was commissioned on 26 December 1914. By March 1915, she was listed as being a member of the Minelaying Squadron. On 8 May 1915 Princess Margaret and Princess Irene laid a minefield northwest of Heligoland, with Princess Margaret laying 490 mines. On 16 August 1915, Princess Margaret, escorted by two divisions of the 10th Destroyer Flotilla, eight destroyers in total, was tasked with laying a minefield on the Amrum Bank. At about 8:45 pm five patrolling German destroyers encountered the British force near the Horns Reefs light vessel.  The German destroyer  fired two torpedoes, one of which stuck the British destroyer . Princess Margaret turned away to avoid the attack, with the rest of the British destroyers (most of which had not spotted the German ships and thought that Mentor had struck a mine) following. The German force also turned away, and Mentor, which had her bow blown off, was left by herself to make her way back to base. Despite the damage, Mentor made it safely back to Harwich. On 10 September 1915 Princess Margaret and the minelayers  and  set out from the Humber with a close escort of six destroyers and with  heavy distant covering forces (including most of the rest of the Harwich Force and the Battle Cruiser Force out of Rosyth) on Operation CY, another attempt to lay a minefield off the Amrum Bank. This time the Germans did not interfere, and the three minelayers laid a total of 1,450 mines on the night of 10/11 September. The German light cruiser  struck a mine in this minefield on the night of 21/22 April 1916. On the night of 8/9 November 1915 Princess Margaret and Angora laid another field of 850 mines to replace the field laid in September, which had been discovered by the Germans. While the minefield was laid successfully, the destroyer , part of the covering force, struck a German mine on the return journey to Harwich.

By March 1916, Princess Margaret was listed as flagship of the Minesweeping Squadron. On 20 March 1916, Princess Margaret, Orviedo,  and  laid mines in the North Sea approaches to the English Channel and Thames, between the North Hinder and Galloper light ships. On 24 April 1916, Princess Margaret, together with Biarritz, Orvieto and Paris, laid a large minefield off the Belgian coast, which was supplemented by mine-nets laid by trawlers, in order to constrain the activities of German submarines based in Flanders. On 3–4 May 1916, the British launched Operation XX, an attempt to lure the German High Seas Fleet out to sea where it could be attacked, and to draw German naval forces away from the Baltic. The seaplane carriers  and  would launch an air attack on the German Airship base at Tondern. Minefields would be laid at the exits of the swept channels through the Heligoland Bight, which any German forces sortieing in response would have to pass through, with 10 submarines waiting off the Horns Reef and off Terschelling.

On 15 May 1916, Princess Margaret laid mines off the Belgian coast to reinforce the existing minefields. Princess Margaret and Paris laid mines near the Thornton Ridge on 24 May 1916, and on 4 August 1916, the British light cruiser  stuck a mine off the Thornton Ridge, probably from this minefield. On 18 May 1916, as a response to the German Bombardment of Yarmouth and Lowestoft on 24 April that year, Princess Margaret, Paris and Biarritz laid a defensive minefield between Lowestoft and Caister to prevent further attacks by German surface warships.

Early in 1917, Admiral Beatty, commander of the Grand Fleet, proposed to completely block off the Heligoland Bight with mines. While this was not practicable at the time owing to a lack of efficient mines, minelaying operations in the Bight continued steadily in January 1917. Princess Margaret and  laid 452 mines in the central part of the Bight on 25 January. Operations in the Bight continued in February, with Princess Margaret laying 543 mines out of a total of 1464 laid in the Bight that month. A minefield laid by Princess Margaret on 29 March 1917 may have sunk the German submarine  sometime after 19 April that year. As well as mining the Bight, Princess Margaret continued to lay defensive minefields in home waters, and on 8 May 1917, together with Angora and Wahine, laid 416 mines off Orfordness. While quickly discovered by the Germans, this minefield proved highly effective, sinking the minesweeper  on 8 June 1917, SS Turin on 15 June 1916 and the submarine  on 29 November 1917. Later that month, Princess Margaret was under repair owing to turbine problems.

Princess Margaret continued operations in the Channel until January 1918, when she was withdrawn to take part in the Northern Barrage, a more ambitious plan to block the exits of the North Sea to stop German U-boats from attacking shipping in the Atlantic. Work began on laying the Northern Barrage in March 1918. By the end of the war, Princess Margaret had laid 25,242 mines, more than any other Royal Navy ship in the war.

Russian Civil War

Shortly after the end of World War I, Princess Margaret was part of the initial British deployment to the Baltic during the British intervention in the Russian Civil War. She and Angora delivered supplies, including 5000 rifles, to the nascent Estonian army at the port of Reval in November 1918. In December 1918, Princess Margaret, together with the cruiser  and two destroyers, was deployed to Latvia. The ships reached Riga on 19 December, and found the city in danger of capture by advancing Bolshevik forces. As the situation deteriorated, Princess Margaret embarked 350 refugees (mainly British, Allied and neutral civilians) on 28 December, with more refugees being embarked before the force left Riga on 3 January 1919, shortly before the city was captured by the Red Army. Princess Margaret then returned to Britain with the rest of the force, reaching Rosyth on 10 January.

Princess Margaret was formally purchased by the Royal Navy on 14 June 1919, and soon returned to the Baltic as the British intervention continued, this time as a minelayer rather than a transport, and in company with the minelaying destroyers of the 20th Destroyer Flotilla, reaching Reval at the end of June. Princess Margaret and the minelaying destroyers laid minefields to protect the British base at Reval from potential attacks by Russian ships, with Princess Margaret returning to Britain in September once the minefields had been laid. She returned to the Baltic in October 1919, and was present when the German-controlled West Russian Volunteer Army attacked Riga, which had been freed from the Bolsheviks earlier in the year, on 8 October. On 12 October, refugees from the fighting, including members of the British Missions, were embarked aboard Princess Margaret. Princess Margaret returned to Britain in December 1919.

Later career
Princess Margaret was refitted as an Admiralty Yacht in 1921. Marie Margaretha sank, and Princess Margaret rescued all twelve members of her crew.

Princess Margaret was sold for scrap on 30 May 1929.

References

External links
 

1914 ships
Ships built on the River Clyde
Minelayers of the Royal Navy
World War I mine warfare vessels of the United Kingdom
Allied intervention in the Russian Civil War
Maritime incidents in 1924